The Human Gamble was a 1916 American silent Short film directed by Lloyd B. Carleton. The film is based on the story and screen adaptation by Calder Johnstone. The  drama stars Dorothy Davenport, Emory Johnson, and a cast of Universal contract players.

The story revolves around a stockbroker Father and his two children. Both work at the father's firm, but the son gets fired for gambling. His sister follows him out the door.  They both go to work for a rival firm. Financial adventures ensue, and the daughter ends up saving her father's brokerage house from financial ruin.

Universal released the film on October 8, 1916.

Plot
John Hill is a successful wall-street stock trader and runs his own brokerage house. Hill has achieved his success through prudent investments and hard work. He hoped to instill these qualities in his children. He has a son, Charles, and a daughter, Flavia. Both of his children work at the Hill brokerage house. Charles Hill, along with being a stockbroker, also loves to gamble. While spending a considerable amount of time at the gaming tables, he has racked up debts. His father has helped him repay a few of these debts. John Hill believes his son's gambling habit sends the wrong message to potential investment clients. His gambling habits also jeopardized his ascent to the president of the brokerage house.

Since John Hill despises anyone identified with gambling, his resentment of his son's gambling grows until his emotions boil. He demands his son to move out of the house and then disowns him. Flavia must choose between supporting her brother or her father. She supports her brother, and they both move away while resigning their positions at their father's company.

Time passes, both siblings find employment at a rival brokerage company. They become confidential clerks for the brokerage house owner, Frank Garner. Both become successful at their new positions. Flavia moves up the ranks and becomes the company's office supervisor. Flavia's beauty and acumen with stocks catch Frank's eye. Frank and Flavia grow closer and develop feelings for each other. They set a date, and the couple marries. They share ownership of the Brokerage house.

A financial war breaks out between the two brokerage houses. Amid this rivalry, Frank Garner becomes very ill. Flavia takes charge of the brokerage house. It is up to Flavia to sustain the competition against her father. Flavia brings the Garner house to new financial heights while pushing her father to the brink of total collapse.

Her father calls Flavia and pleads with her to help him. The rivalry has reached a point where she must decide between an obligation to her father and her husband's love. At first, she refuses to help her father since she has a point to prove. Also, if she helps her father, it will ruin her husband's business.

Flavia reconsiders and decides Blood is thicker than water. She scrambles to her father's office and finds him about to commit suicide. Flavia develops a quick financial recovery plan for her father. She engineers a financial bailout of her father's company reaps a windfall profit and saves her father's brokerage house. Her father regains his financial footing and repays the debt to his daughter. They settled all financial obligations between the two rival companies. The Hill family reconciles while saving her father's company, and they all live happy lives.

Cast

Production

Pre-production

Development
According to the book - The Universal Story, Carl Laemmle (1867-1939) produced around 91 movies in 1916.
Lloyd B. Carleton (–1933) started working for Carl Laemmle in the Fall of 1915. Carleton arrived with impeccable credentials, having directed some 60 films for the likes of Thanhouser, Lubin, Fox, and Selig. 
Between March and December 1916, 44-year-old Lloyd Carleton directed 16 movies for Universal, starting with The Yaqui and ending with The Morals of Hilda. Emory Johnson acted in all 16 of these films. Of Carleton's total 1916 output, 11 were feature films, and the rest were two-reel shorts.

In 1916, Carleton directed all 13 films pairing Dorothy Davenport and Emory Johnson. This film would be the eleventh in the 13-film series. These totals show Carl Laemmle gave Davenport-Johnson pairing one of his elite directors from the working cadre of universal directors to produce the screen chemistry Laemmle was seeking.

Casting
All players in this film were under contract with Universal.
Dorothy Davenport (1895-1977) was an established star for Universal when the  year-old actress played Flavia Hill. She had acted in hundreds of movies by the time she starred in this film. Most of these films were 2-reel shorts, as was the norm in Hollywood's teen years. She had been making movies since 1910. She started dating Wally Reid when she was barely 16, and he was 20. They married in 1913. After her husband died in 1923, she used the name "Mrs. Wallace Reid" in the credits for any project she took part in. Besides being an actress, she would eventually become a film director, producer, and writer.
Emory Johnson (1894-1960) was  years old when he starred in this movie as Charles Hill. Carl Laemmle of Universal Film Manufacturing Company thought he saw great potential in Johnson, so he chose him to be Universal's new leading man. Laemmle's hope was Johnson would become another Wallace Reed. A major part of his plan was to create a movie couple that would sizzle on the silver screen. Laemmle thought Dorothy Davenport and Emory Johnson could create the chemistry he sought.  Johnson and Davenport would complete 13 films together. They started with the successful feature production of Doctor Neighbor in May 1916 and ended with The Devil's Bondwoman in November 1916. After completing the last movie, Laemmle thought Johnson did not have the screen presence he wanted. He decided not to renew his contract. Johnson would make 17 movies in 1916, including 6 shorts and 11 feature-length Dramas. 1916 would become the second-highest movie output of his entire acting career. Emory acted in 25 films for Universal, mostly dramas with a sprinkling of comedies and westerns.
Richard Morris (1862-1924)  was  years old when he played Frank Garner. He was a character actor and former opera singer known for Granny (1913). He would eventually participate in many Johnson projects, including  |In the Name of the Law (1922),  The Third Alarm (1922),  The West~Bound Limited (1923), The Mailman (1923) until his untimely death in 1924.
Alfred Allen (1866-1947) was  years old when he played John Hill. Allen was highly educated, had a commanding presence, stood six feet tall, and weighed two hundred pounds. He got his start in the film industry at Universal city in 1913.  He landed his first role in 1915. His roles were character parts, and he played mostly fathers, villains, or ranch owners. Alfred Allen appeared in 69 features from 1916 through 1929. After Heartaches he would appear in four more Davenport-Johnson projects: ‘’A Yoke of Gold,’’ The Unattainable, The Human Gamble and Barriers of Society.

Screenplay
Calder Johnstone (1880–1958) wrote both the story and screen adaptation.

Filming
The Davenport-Johnson pairing produced 13 films which over half were feature-length. Before The Human Gamble, the pairing had headlined five feature-length films, including: 
Doctor Neighbor, The Way of the World, A Yoke of Gold, The Unattainable, and Black Friday 
According to an article in The York Gazette:
"Lloyd Carleton, Dorothy Davenport, and Emory Johnson make their appearance on the Universal program in a two-reel, after a protracted period of stardom in Red Feather and Bluebird features. The Human Gamble was initially intended to be a five-reel picture, but after the production was well underway, it was discovered that it would be much better as a short-reel picture."

Post production

Based on an American Film Institute standard, films with a running time of forty minutes or longer are considered feature films. By 1915, feature films were starting to become more the trend in Hollywood. While advertising this film, a Universal ad is shown in the graphic, also expounds on short films.
The moving picture business is here to stay. That you must admit despite carping critics and blundering sore-heads. True, some exhibitors have found business so good lately — but if you get down to facts when you look for the reason why, it's a 100 to 1 shot that they are, and for some time have been, dallying with a feature program. Some of these wise ones will tell you that business has picked up since they went into features, — BUT — ask them whether they are talking NET or GROSS. They will find they have an immediate appointment and terminate your queries unceremoniously. Funny how we like to kid ourselves, isn't it? The man who is packing 'em in and losing money on features is envied by his competitor, who is laying by a bit every day, and has a good steady, dependable patronage but admits to a few vacant seats at some performances. When this chap wakes up, he will realize that he has a gold mine and that good advertising will make it produce to capacity. The moral is that if you can tie up to the Universal Program, DO IT. If you can't NOW, watch your first chance. Let the people know what you have, and let the feature man go on to ruin if he wants to. You should worry!

Studios
The movie was filmed at the studio complex at Universal Studios located at 100 Universal City Plaza in  Universal City, California

Release and reception

Official release
The copyright was filed with U.S. Copyright Office and entered into the record as shown:
 THE HUMAN GAMBLE. Rex. 1916. 2 reels.Credits: Calder Johnstone; Producer, Lloyd B. Carleton. © Universal Film Mfg. Co., Inc.; 21Sep16;LP9161.
This film was officially released on October 8, 1916.

Advertising
In 1916, full-page ads were not de rigueur for short films. A brief synopsis was more the standard, along with a few half-page descriptions of the film's plot.

Many of the newspaper ads for the film use the following Tagline:
a Financial Drama, Wall Street, or The Card Room, is There any real Difference?

Other newspaper ads use the following hook to attract paying customers:
 story of a business war waged within the immediate family of John Hill. - Hypocrite

One newspaper advertisement shows The Human Gamble playing along with two other films:
 William Lowery and Agnes Vernon starring the two-reel drama The Call of the Past. 
 Gale Henry and Billy Franey starring the one-reel comedy The Inspector's Double.

Referencing "The Universal Program" detailed above, this is an example of a "diversified program."

Reviews
Lengthy detailed reviews for short films were rare. The Hollywood magazines primarily reviewed feature films and only gave short films honorable mention. Of course, in 1916, movie magazines were evolving and becoming more sophisticated like the movies they reviewed and advertised.

In the October 14, 1916 issue of The Moving Picture World,  quoted from the section - Comments on the Films - Exclusively by our own Staff:

The November 1, 1916 issue of The York Gazette & Daily, the reviewer points out:

Preservation status
According to the Library of Congress, all known copies of this film are lost.

Gallery

References

External links
Katchmer, George A. A Biographical Dictionary of Silent Film Western Actors and Actresses, McFarland, 2002, p. 204.
Holmstrom, John. The Moving Picture Boy: An International Encyclopaedia from 1895 to 1995, Norwich, Michael Russell, 1996.
List of Universal Pictures films (1912–1919)
Universal Pictures
List of American films of 1916

1916 lost films
1916 drama films
1916 films
American black-and-white films
American silent short films
Lost American films
Silent American drama films
Universal Pictures short films
Films directed by Lloyd B. Carleton
1910s English-language films
1910s American films
American drama short films